Rübezahl und der Sackpfeifer von Neisse is a 1904 opera in 4 acts by Hans Sommer to a libretto by Eberhard König based on the Rübezahl fairy tale. The opera premiered at the Hoftheater in Braunschweig on 15 April 1904.

Recording
Rübezahl und der Sackpfeifer von Neisse - Magnus Piontek, Johannes Beck, Anne Preuß, Jueun Jeon, Opernchor von Theater & Philharmonie Thüringen, Philharmonisches Orchester Altenburg-Gera, Laurent Wagner PAN 2016

References

Operas
1904 operas